A vision is something seen in a dream, trance, or religious ecstasy, especially a supernatural appearance that usually conveys a revelation. Visions generally have more clarity than dreams, but traditionally fewer psychological connotations. Visions are known to emerge from spiritual traditions and could provide a lens into human nature and reality. Prophecy is often associated with visions.

Categories 

Evelyn Underhill distinguishes and categorizes three types of visions:

 Intellectual Visions – The Catholic dictionary defines these as supernatural knowledge in which the mind receives an extraordinary grasp of some revealed truth without the aid of sensible impressions and mystics describe them as intuitions that leave a deep impression.
 Imaginary – In Teresa of Avila's The Interior Castle, an imaginary vision is defined as one where nothing is seen or heard by the senses of seeing or hearing, but where the same impression is received that would be produced upon the imagination by the senses if some real object were perceived by them. Niels Christian Hvidt refers to them as visions recognized through mechanisms of the human psyche that are made up of things a soul has acquired through contact with reality.
 Corporeal – A supernatural manifestation of an object to the eyes of the body. It may take place in two ways: either a figure really present strikes the retina and there determines the physical phenomenon of the vision, or an agent superior to man directly modifies the visual organ and produces in the composite a sensation equivalent to that which an external object would produce. Underhill refers to this vision type as "little else than an uncontrolled externalization of inward memories, thoughts, or intuitions"

Examples 

Visions are listed in approximately chronological order whenever possible, although some dates may be in dispute.

 Vision of Jeremiah in the first chapter of the Book of Jeremiah, a boiling pot from the north.
 Vision of Isaiah in the first chapter of the Book of Isaiah, predicting the siege of Jerusalem and destruction of the first temple.
 Vision of God in the first chapter of the Book of Ezekiel (6th century BC)
 Vision of a heavenly figure "like a son of man" in Daniel 7:13 (6th century / 2nd century BC)
 Post-resurrection appearances of Jesus
 Paul the Apostle's vision of Jesus on the road to Damascus (1st century)
 Marian apparitions (visions or visitations of Mary, mother of Jesus) (1st century AD – present)
 Visions of the afterlife in the martyr accounts of Perpetua and Felicity (2nd century AD)
 Constantine's vision of Christ's sign (312 AD)
 Jakob Böhme's vision (1600 AD), in which he observed the beauty of a beam of sunlight in a pewter dish
 René Descartes' series of dreams on the night of 11 November 1619, which set the course of his life in science
 Blaise Pascal's vision of 23 November 1654, which reinvigorated his spiritual commitment
 Emanuel Swedenborg's visions, which formed the basis of a newly revealed doctrine (beginning in 1740s)
 The Three Witnesses: Oliver Cowdery, David Whitmer and Martin Harris claimed that they were shown the Book of Mormon's golden plates by an angel on 28 June 1829. They also stated that they heard a voice from heaven declaring that they were translated miraculously. With over 150 documented statements, it is the most well-documented vision in history.
 Ramakrishna had several visions of religious figures including Kali, Sita, Krishna, Jesus, and Muhammed. (mid/late 19th century)
 Nat Turner's vision of 12 February 1831, in which he saw an actual eclipse of the sun that day as a black man's hand covering the solar orb, interpreting it as a sign to launch his slave rebellion.

See also

 Altered state of consciousness
 Apparitional experience
 Astral plane
 Astral projection
 Dream world (plot device)
 Beatific vision
 Epiphany (feeling)
 Extrasensory Perception
 Hallucination
 Illusion
 Kashf
 Lourdes apparitions
 Mysticism
 Neurotheology
 Private revelation
 Psychedelics
 Foresight (psychology)
 Religious experience
 Shamanism
 Simulated reality
 Simulated reality in fiction
 Temporal lobe epilepsy
 Theophany
 Vision quest

References

 
Revelation
Hallucinations